The 155 mm gun M1 was a 155 millimeter caliber field gun developed and used by the United States military. Nicknamed "Long Tom" (an appellation with a long and storied history in U.S. field and naval artillery), it was produced in M1 and M2  variants, later known as the M59. Developed to replace the Canon de 155mm GPF, the gun was deployed as a heavy field weapon during World War II and the Korean War, and also classed as secondary armament for seacoast defense.

The Long Tom was also adopted by a number of other nations, including the United Kingdom, Austria, Israel, and the Netherlands.

Development 
Before entering World War I, the United States was poorly equipped with heavy artillery. To address this problem a number of foreign heavy artillery guns were adopted, including the Canon de 155 mm GPF. After the end of the war the Westervelt Board was convened to assess the artillery experience of the combatant powers and map out future directions for the US Army artillery. A number of prototypes were produced in the 1920s and 1930s, but the projects were put on hold due to lack of funds. In 1938 the 155 mm gun T4 on carriage T2 was finally adopted as 155 mm gun M1 on carriage M1.

155 mm gun M1 
The new gun design used a barrel similar to the earlier 155 mm GPF, but with an Asbury mechanism that incorporated a vertically-hinged breech plug support. This type of breech used an interrupted-thread breech plug with a lock that opened and closed the breech by moving a single lever. The ammunition for the 155 mm gun was "separate-loading", that is with the shell and the powder charge packaged, shipped and stored separately. The shell is lifted into position behind the breech and then rammed into the chamber to engage the shell's rotating band into the barrel rifling.

Ramming the shell home is followed by loading a number of powder bags, as required for the desired range. The powder charge could be loaded in up to seven charge settings. Once the powder is loaded, the breech plug is closed and locked, and a primer is placed in the breech plug's firing mechanism. After setting the elevation and azimuth, the gun is ready to fire. The firing mechanism is a device for initiating the ammunition primer. The primer then sets off the igniter which ignites the propelling charge of the ammunition. A continuous-pull lanyard first cocks the firing pin, then fires the primer when pulled.

The gun was developed into M1A1 and M2 variants. After World War II, the United States Army re-organized, and the gun was re-designated as the M59.

Carriage M1 
The gun carriage provides a stable, yet mobile, base for the gun. The new split-trail carriage featured an eight-wheel integral two-axle bogie and a two-wheel limber that supported the trails for transport. The carriage was a two-piece design. The upper carriage included the side frames with trunnion bearings that supported the recoil mechanism that carried the gun cradle, slide and gun tube. The upper carriage also incorporated the elevating and azimuth gearing. The upper carriage pivoted in azimuth on the lower carriage. The lower carriage included the transport suspension and the split-trail that stabilized and absorbed recoil when the gun was fired.

After the gun was placed in a firing position with the gun pointing in the desired direction, the trails were lowered to the ground and the limber was removed. The carriage wheels would then be raised using built-in ratcheting screw-jacks, lowering the gun carriage to the ground. Once on the ground, the limber-end of the trail legs were separated to form a wide "vee" shape with its apex at the center of the carriage pivot point. A recoil spade at the limber-end of each trail leg required a correctly positioned hole to be dug for the spade, which was attached to the trail end, to transmit the recoil from gun carriage through the trails and into the earth. This made the gun very stable and assisted its accuracy. The removable spades were transported in brackets on the trail legs.

The carriage M1 and M2 were shared with the  Howitzer M1, differing only in the gun tube, sleigh, cradle, recoil and equilibrators, weight due to the heavier barrel.

Specifications

Service 

The Long Tom saw combat for the first time in the North African Campaign on December 24, 1942, with "A" Battery of the 36th Field Artillery Regiment. Eventually it equipped 33 U.S. Army battalions in the European and Mediterranean Theaters (the 173rd, 190th, 200th, 208th, 240th, 261st, 273rd, 514th–516th, 528th, 530th, 540th, 541st, 546th–549th, 559th, 561st, 634th, 635th, 731st, 733rd, 734th, 766th, 976th–981st, 985th and 989th), and 8 in the Pacific Theater (the 168th, 223rd, 226th, 433rd, 517th, 531st, 532nd, and 983rd). The 353rd, 732nd, and 993rd Field Artillery Battalions were  segregated 155 mm gun units that never went overseas. The 353rd was converted to the 1697th Engineer Combat Battalion (Colored) on 19 March 1944 at Camp Van Dorn, Mississippi, the 732nd was converted to the 1695th Engineer Combat Battalion (Colored) on 15 March 1944 at Camp Pickett, Virginia, and the 993rd was converted to the 1696th Engineer Combat Battalion (Colored) on 19 March 1944 at Camp Swift, Texas.

The 155 mm gun was also used by several Marine defense battalions, notably during Operation Cartwheel in 1943.

The preferable prime mover was initially the Mack NO 6×6 7½ ton truck; from 1943 on, it was supplemented by the tracked M4 High Speed Tractor. 72 rounds of ammunition plus propelling charges could be carried in the M21 4-ton, 2-wheel ammunition trailer; 16 rounds of ammunition plus propelling charges could be carried in the M10 1-ton, 2-wheel ammunition trailer that was often used because of shortages of the former. The later heavy M23 8-ton, 4-wheel ammunition trailer introduced in 1945 could carry 96 rounds of ammunition plus propelling charges.

A small number of Long Tom guns were authorised for supply via Lend-Lease channels, to the United Kingdom (184) and France (25). The authorised establishment of British batteries (excluding training units), including four batteries from the Dominion of Newfoundland, totalled 88 guns.

Variants 

Gun variants:
 M1920 – prototype.
 T4 – prototype.
 M1 (1938) – first production variant, 20 built.
 M1A1 (1941) – modified breech ring.
 M1A1E1 – prototype with chromium-plated bore.
 M1A1E3 – prototype with liquid cooling.
 M2 Standard (1945) – with modified breech ring.

Carriage variants:
 T2 – prototype.
 M1 (1938).
 M1A1 – refurbished T2 carriages.
 M2 Standard

Limber variants:
 M1 Standard (1938)
 M5 Heavy (1945)

The gun was also mounted on a modified M4 medium tank chassis, in mount M13. The resulting vehicle was initially designated 155 mm Gun Motor Carriage T83 and eventually standardized as 155 mm Gun Motor Carriage M40.
155 mm Gun Motor Carriage T79, based on T23 Medium Tank chassis, never advanced past proposal stage.
A portable "Panama mount" M1 was also provided.

Ammunition 

The gun utilized separate loading, bagged charge ammunition. The propelling charge consisted of base (9.23 kg) and increment (4.69 kg). The data in the table below is for supercharge (base and increment).

Existing examples

Pakistan 
 Pakistan Army Museum, Rawalpindi

Austria 
 Bunkermuseum Wurzenpass, Wurzen Pass (near Villach)

Australia 
 Fort Lytton Military Museum, Brisbane.

Israel 
 Batey ha-Osef Museum, Tel Aviv, Israel

Germany 

 Grafenwoehr Training Area – this particular cannon is apparently a return from Italy, based on Italian language markings added, and old Pirelli tires.

Netherlands 
 Wings of Liberation Museum Park in Best (near Eindhoven), Netherlands

Slovenia 
 Pivka Military History Park, Pivka, Slovenia

United Kingdom 
 Pendennis Castle, Cornwall, UK
 Royal Armouries, Fort Nelson, Hampshire, UK
 Muckleburgh Military Collection, Norfolk, UK
 Eden Camp Museum, North Yorkshire, UK

United States 

 Fort Jackson, Columbia, South Carolina
 Battleship Memorial Park, Mobile, Alabama
 Timber Linn Park, Albany, Oregon
 US Army Ordnance Museum, Aberdeen, Maryland
 VFW Zachary Taylor Post 3784, Baton Rouge, Louisiana.
 Georgia Veterans Memorial State Park, Cordele, Georgia
 Fort Sill Field Artillery Museum, Fort Sill, Oklahoma
 Iowa Gold Star Military Museum, Camp Dodge, Johnston, Iowa
 VFW Post 2330, Searcy, AR
 Museum of American Armor, Old Bethpage, New York
 Scotland Meadows Park, New Castle, Pennsylvania
 General George Patton Museum and Center of Leadership, Fort Knox, Kentucky.
 VFW Post 61, Kansas City, MO
 Flying Heritage & Combat Armor Museum, Everett, WA
 Watervliet Arsenal, Watervliet, NY
 American Legion George Johns Post 447, Round Rock, Texas

See also 
 List of U.S. Army weapons by supply catalog designation SNL D-24
 15 cm Kanone 18 German equivalent
 152 mm gun M1935 (Br-2) Soviet equivalent, built only in small numbers
 Cannone da 149/40 modello 35 Italian equivalent, only few built

Notes

References

External links 

 155-mm. Novel Mechanical Features Give Big-Gun Power, Small Gun Speed, November 1942, Popular Science early article with many photos and detailed drawings showing how it is brought into firing position from travel mode.

World War II field artillery
World War II artillery of the United States
World War II artillery of the United Kingdom
Cold War artillery of the United States
155 mm artillery
Coastal artillery
Weapons and ammunition introduced in 1940